Olivier Dahan (born 26 June 1967) is a French film director and screenwriter. His third directed film, La Vie en rose, was one of the only French cinema films to win two Academy Awards, including the first acting Oscar in the French language.

Biography
Dahan was born in La Ciotat, France, to a father of Algerian-Jewish origin. In 1991, Olivier Dahan received a diploma in art at the Art school of Marseille, then shot several short subjects and clips.

In the beginning of 2004, he decided to shoot a film on the life of the French singer Édith Piaf. The film was a success and the actress Marion Cotillard won the Academy Award for Best Actress. Upon accepting the award, she credited Olivier Dahan for changing her life in whole and as an actress.

In the afterwards of the Academy Award ceremony, Olivier Dahan started to work on an English-language road movie named My Own Love Song released on April 7, 2010.

Selected filmography

Feature films
 Frères (1994), starring Nabil El Bouhairi, Véronique Octon, Samy Naceri, & Romain Duris
 Déjà mort (1998), starring Romain Duris, Benoît Magimel and Zoé Félix
 Le Petit Poucet (2001), starring Élodie Bouchez, Romane Bohringer and Catherine Deneuve
 La Vie promise (2002), starring Isabelle Huppert and Pascal Greggory
 Crimson Rivers II: Angels of the Apocalypse (2004), starring Jean Reno, Benoît Magimel and Christopher Lee
 La Vie en rose (2007), starring Marion Cotillard, Sylvie Testud and Clotilde Courau
 My Own Love Song (2009), starring Renée Zellweger, Forest Whitaker and Nick Nolte
 The Dream Team (2012) starring José García, Jean-Pierre Marielle, Gad Elmaleh, Joeystarr and Omar Sy
 Grace of Monaco (2014), starring Nicole Kidman, Tim Roth and Frank Langella
 Simone Veil, A Woman of the Century (2021)

Musicals
 Mozart, l'opéra rock (2009)

Awards and nominations
Nominations:

 BAFTA – Best Film Not in the English Language for La Vie en rose (shared with Alain Goldmen)
 Berlin International Film Festival – Golden Berlin Bear for La Vie en rose
 César Awards – Best Director, Best Film (shared with Alain Goldmen) and Best Original Writing for La Vie en rose
 European Film Awards – Best Film for La Vie en rose
 Globe de Cristal – Best Film for La Vie en rose
 San Sebastián International Film Festival – Golden Seashell for La Vie promise
 Satellite Awards – Best Director for La Vie en rose

Wins:

 Philadelphia Film Festival – Audience Award – Best Feature Film for La Vie en rose
 Torino International Festival of Young Cinema – FIPRESCI Prize, Special Mention for Tous les garçons et les filles de leur âge

References

External links

1967 births
20th-century French Sephardi Jews
French film directors
French male screenwriters
French screenwriters
Living people
French-language film directors
People from La Ciotat